Jean-Henri Azéma, called Jean Azéma (28 December 1913 – 13 October 2000) was a French poet of Réunionnais origin.  Born in Saint-Denis, he died in Buenos Aires, where he had fled after collaborating with the Nazis during World War II.  His son was the historian Jean-Pierre Azéma.

References
Brief biographical sketch on answers.com

1913 births
2000 deaths
People from Saint-Denis, Réunion
Poets from Réunion
French expatriates in Argentina
French Waffen-SS personnel
20th-century French poets
French male poets
20th-century French male writers